Wellington is an unincorporated community in Calhoun County, Alabama, United States. Wellington has a post office with ZIP code 36279.

Notable residents 
Teresa Cheatham
Lynnette Hesser
Steve Loucks

References

Unincorporated communities in Calhoun County, Alabama
Unincorporated communities in Alabama